Bahuparak is a 2014 Indian Kannada language drama film written, directed and co-produced by Simple Suni of Simple Agi Ondh Love Story fame. The movie was released in the month of July 2014. The film features  Srinagar Kitty and Meghana Raj in the lead roles.  This film marks the 25th venture for the actor Srinagar Kitty.

The film commenced its shooting in July 2013 and released its first trailer soon after the shooting began. Mahohar Joshi is the cinematographer and Bharath B. J., who also composed the music for the movie Simple Agi Ondh Love Story, has composed the score for this film as well.

Plot

The movie opens with a call for a play titled 'Bahuparak'. The play opens with a character, which is portrayed by well known thinker and stand up comedian Richard Louis, expounding tenets of life and the principles of Karma. The story moves into a scene where the three main characters namely Manas, Mani, and Mauni, all played by Srinagar Kitty are introduced and each one starts narrating their life experiences.

Manas kicks off the story where he is shown as a handsome hunk who is on his way to meet the love of his life. However, his joy soon turns into gloom when he learns of a tragic news. The story, now being told in three distinct tracks, switches to the point where Mani is introduced. Mani is found unconscious on the road. He meets a friend named Mohan, who takes him in and helps him to etch out a living. However, Mani fails to make a living in the mainstream way, and he and Mohan soon take the shortcut and start robbing unsuspecting people, which soon enough to their bad luck ends in a murder. They are picked up by the police, where an inspector offers them a choice. Either go to jail for a long time or take the blame for a murder they didn't commit, and get out on bail. Mani and Mohan accept the offer.

The story then moves to a village, somewhere in North Karnataka. Mauni, a limping middle aged aspiring politician is frustrated because the person he helped to win an election has deserted him. To further exacerbate his feelings, he suffers a humiliating defeat in the next election. At this point, one of his friend's, also acting as his trusted adviser, leads Mauni to adopt the tried and tested method to win an election i.e. through money and muscle power.

The story ever revolving around Manas, Mani, and Mauni switches back to Manas, where it is revealed that his childhood friend Sneha played by Meghana Raj has stepped into his life. Just when Manas decides to propose Sneha, her twin sister, Preethi, enters their lives causing further turmoil in Manas's life.

Meanwhile, Mani, now slowly making his way as a big rowdy, soon establishes himself as a strong underworld don. Whereas Mauni reaches the highest echelons of power, however, his greed for power soon reaches unfathomable positions.

The story takes a critical turn at the point where, Manas, caught in the love triangle between Sneha and Preethi. Mani, caught in the cross fire of becoming the biggest don in the country. Mauni, who wants to become a top notch politician.

Will Manas come out unscathed? Will Mani reach his goal of becoming the biggest don? Will Mauni be able to quench his insatiable thirst for power? But, above all of this, who is Manas, Mani, and Mauni?. How their lives are linked forms the rest of the story.

Production
Bahuparak features Kitty in three different roles spanning three different generations. The film began the shoot in a 73-year-old house in North Karnataka. The film dialogues are written by one of the leading Kannada daily journalist, Hari.

Cast
 Srinagar Kitty as Manas / Mani / Mouni (Three stage of life)
 Meghana Raj as Sneha / Preethi (Dual roles)
 Naveen Sagar as Virus
 Manasa Rao as Samanvaya
 Sukrutha Wagle as Prathibimba
 Rakshit Shetty in guest appearance as Richie
 Pawan Wadeyar in guest appearance as Director Pawan
 Sundar Raj
 Pramila Joshai
 Bhavana Rao (Special appearance) 
 Vijeth as Mohana 
 Naveen Shankar as a salesman

Soundtrack
The soundtrack for the film was composed by Bharath B. J., making his second successive collaboration with the director Suni after Simple Agi Ondh Love Story. While the major part of the songs are penned by director Suni himself, the soundtrack also features a popular folk song written by Shishunala Sharif. The soundtrack consists of 10 songs.

Track list

Release
The film was released on 25 July 2014 across Karnataka. Majestic, known as the heart of Kannada Cinema theaters, featured this movie in the renovated Menaka theater.

Reception

The movie has received mixed to positive reviews. The three track storytelling style has been hailed as an experiment hitherto unknown in the Kannada Industry. Suni's style of narration, dialogues, and songs especially the melodious "Usiraaguve" track has heads swaying.

References

External links

 Bahuparak Starts
 Muhurat of Bahuparak Movie Held in Metro

2014 films
2010s Kannada-language films
Indian drama films
2014 drama films
Films directed by Suni